The 2004 Open Gaz de France was a women's tennis tournament played on indoor hard courts at the Stade Pierre de Coubertin in Paris in France that was part of Tier II of the 2004 WTA Tour. The tournament was held from 9 February until 15 February 2004. First-seeded Kim Clijsters won the singles title.

Finals

Singles

 Kim Clijsters defeated  Mary Pierce 6–2, 6–1
 It was Clijsters's 1st title of the year and the 31st title of her career.

Doubles

 Barbara Schett /  Patty Schnyder defeated  Silvia Farina Elia /  Francesca Schiavone 6–3, 6–2
 It was Schett's only title of the year and the 13th title of her career. It was Schnyder's only title of the year and the 12th of her career.

External links 
 ITF tournament edition details

Open Gaz de France
Open GDF Suez
Open Gaz de France
Open Gaz de France
Open Gaz de France
Open Gaz de France